Moonee Valley may refer to:

City of Moonee Valley
Moonee Valley Football Club
Moonee Valley Racing Club
Moonee Valley Racecourse